Frank Douglas Sykes ( – ) born in Batley, was an English rugby union footballer who played in the 1940s, 1950s and 1960s. He played at representative level for British Lions (non-Test matches), England, and Yorkshire, and at club level for Huddersfield, and Northampton, as a Wing, i.e. number 11 or 14.

Playing career

International honours
Frank Sykes won caps for England in 1955 against France and Scotland, and in 1963 against New Zealand, and Australia.

County honours
Frank Sykes played seventy-nine matches for Yorkshire, including sixty-six consecutive County Championship matches.

References

External links

1927 births
2017 deaths
Huddersfield R.U.F.C. players
Sportspeople from Batley
Rugby union wings
Northampton Saints players
British & Irish Lions rugby union players from England
Rugby union players from Yorkshire
Yorkshire County RFU players
England international rugby union players